WMBD may refer to:

 WMBD (AM), a radio station (1470 AM) licensed to Peoria, Illinois, United States
 W262BY, an FM radio translator station (100.3 FM) licensed to Peoria, Illinois, United States, which rebroadcasts WMBD (AM) and is informally referred to as WMBD-FM
 WMBD-TV, a television station (channel 26 digital/31 virtual) licensed to Peoria, Illinois, United States
 WPBG, a radio station (93.3 FM) licensed to Peoria, Illinois, United States, which held the WMBD-FM callsign from 1947 to 1977